Royce David Pearson (born February 10, 1999), is an American record producer, songwriter, and DJ. He has collaborated with and produced singles for multiple rappers including BlocBoy JB, Chris Brown, Gunna, Trippie Redd, and most prominently Lil Mosey. David is known for producing singles like "Noticed", "Kamikaze", and "Stuck in a Dream" by American rapper Lil Mosey, with the three peaking at 80, 97, and 62 on the US Billboard Hot 100 respectively. "Noticed" topped the Swedish national record chart, Sverigetopplistan, in October 2018.

Early life and career 
Royce David Pearson was born on February 10, 1999, in Seattle, Washington. He attended and graduated from Lakeside School. He began his music career making music alongside fellow rapper Lil Mosey in 2016 as the two started working together  In 2018, David produced Mosey's debut studio album, Northsbest. The album was awarded with RIAA Gold certification and peaked at 29 on the US Billboard 200. In 2019, David produced Certified Hitmaker by Lil Mosey featuring Chris Brown, Trippie Redd, Gunna, and AJ Tracey. The album peaked at twelfth position on the US Billboard 200.

Due to their longtime collaboration, David has been recognized as the key element to Mosey's sound. He is also noted for his producer tag, "Aye Royce, you did it right here!"

Production discography

Singles

Production credits

2017 
Nathan Nzanga – Trixie
01. "Trixie"

2018 
Nathan Nzanga – Welcome To Naytropolis!!!
03. "1st Gen"

Lil Mosey – Northsbest
01. "Kamikaze"
02. "Fu Shit"
03. "Noticed"
04. "Rarri"
06. "Burberry Headband"
07. "Greet Her"
08. "That's My Bitch"
09. "Yoppa (featuring Blocboy JB)"
10. "Boof Pack"
11. "Trapstar"
12. "Bust Down Cartier"

Lil Mosey
00. "K For Christmas"

2019 

Lil Mosey – Certified Hitmaker
02. "Stuck In A Dream (featuring Gunna)"
03. "Live This Wild"
04. "So Fast"
05. "Rose Gold"
06. "Never Scared (featuring Trippie Redd)"
07. "Bankroll (featuring AJ Tracey)"
08. "Speed Racin"
09. "Jet To The West"
10. "See My Baby"
11. "Dreamin"
12. "Rockstars"
13. "Space Coupe"
14. "G Walk (featuring Chris Brown)"
15. "Kari's World"

References 

1999 births
Living people
People from Seattle
Record producers from Washington (state)
Songwriters from Washington (state)
Lakeside School alumni